The Copa Euskal Herria de Fútbol Femenino is a knockout competition for women's football clubs in the Basque Country. Teams from Navarre and Iparralde had also played this competition.

Since its establishment in 2011, Athletic Bilbao won eight titles and Real Sociedad four. Those two rival clubs appeared in all the finals until 2021, when Alavés qualified for its first final.

From 2020, the lower division competition the 'Copa Vasca' (Basque Cup, won several times by Athletic Bilbao's B-team and once by Real Sociedad's first team) was incorporated as 'Group B' of the Copa Euskal Herria.

Finals

See also
 Copa Catalunya, Catalan counterpart.
 Euskal Herriko Futbol Txapelketa, similar men's version

References

Basque football competitions
Euskal
Euskal